The Grebensky Cossacks or Grebentsy was a group of Cossacks formed in the 16th century from Don Cossacks who left the Don area and settled in the northern foothills of the Caucasus. The Greben Cossacks are part of the Terek Cossacks. They were influenced by Chechen and Nogai culture and most were bilingual in the Russian language and the Nogai language.

Name 
According to the article on Grebentsy in ЭСБЕ (1893), whose author is — a writer  — referring to some historians, who, in turn, allegedly relied on materials from «» and the legend of the Grebensky icon, claimed that Grebensky Cossacks descended from the Don Cossacks who settled in the Caucasus, whose community originally lived in the interfluve Seversky Donets and  near a hill called the Grebensky mountains, hence the name of these Cossacks — Grebensky.

General information

Settlement territory
Modern scholars don′t have information about settlement area of Grebentsy on the right side of the Terek River (old Russian Terka/Terki). Basic facts about these Cossacks appear after relocation to the left bank of the river. In 1712 the Grebensky Cossacks moved to the left bank of the Terek River in the area of the fortification of the Terka/Terki (Sunzhensky fortification).

Notes

References

Bibliography 
 
 Wixman.  The Peoples of the USSR p. 51.

Cossack hosts